Droodles was a syndicated cartoon feature created by Roger Price and collected in his 1953 book Droodles, though the term is now used more generally of similar visual riddles.

Form

The general form is minimal: a square box containing a few abstract pictorial elements with a caption (or several) giving a humorous explanation of the picture's subject. For example, a Droodle depicting three concentric shapeslittle circle, medium circle, big squaremight have the caption "Aerial view of a cowboy in a Port-a-john."

Origins

The trademarked name "Droodle" suggests "doodle", "drawing" and "riddle". However, the form of the droodlea riddle expressed in visual formhas earlier roots, for example in a drawing (indovinelli grafici) by the Italian painter Agostino Carracci (1557–1602), and the term is widely used beyond Price's work.

Droodles are (or were) purely a form of entertainment like any other nonsense cartoon and appeared in roughly the same places (newspapers, paperback collections, bathroom walls) during their heyday in the 1950s and 1960s. The commercial success of Price's collections of Droodles led to the founding of the publishing house Price-Stern-Sloan, and also to the creation of a Droodles-themed game show, Droodles, on NBC in 1954. There was also a droodle-based game called "Mysteriosos" on HBO's Braingames. Series of newspaper advertisements for the News and Max brands of cigarettes featured cigarette-themed Droodles.

Appearances in art and popular culture

One of Price's original Droodles serves as the cover art for Frank Zappa's 1982 album Ship Arriving Too Late to Save a Drowning Witch. Price's other captions for that drawing include "Mother pyramid feeding her baby."

Pictures in a similar style feature in The Little Prince by Antoine de Saint-Exupery.

See also
 Kilroy was here
 Leonard B. Stern
 Mad Libs

References

External links

 Roger Price bio
 Online edition of Estonian droodles
 A psychology of droodles

American game shows
Cartooning
Illustration